Mercy Medical Center is a rural non-profit community hospital located in the city of Roseburg, in the US State of Oregon. Mercy Medical Center has 171 licensed beds on a  campus, and the hospital has a heliport for patients arriving to the emergency department via helicopter.  The hospital is accredited by the Joint Commission on Accreditation of Healthcare Organizations.  Mercy Medical Center is the only hospital in Douglas County, Oregon, and has been since 2000. With 1,139 employees, the hospital is the second largest employer in the county, and in Roseburg.

In the most recent year with available data, Mercy Medical Center had 45,870 emergency department visits, 7,180 admissions, 1,679 inpatient surgeries, and 584 outpatient surgeries. Mercy Medical Center uses the electronic health record MEDITECH.

History
The hospital was started by the Sisters of Mercy in 1909.  At the time, the hospital contained 25 beds. In the year 2000, Douglas Community Hospital closed its doors, making Mercy Medical Center the only hospital in Douglas County, Oregon.

In 2007, Mercy Medical Center closed its behavioral health unit because of costs.

References

External links
 Mercy Medical Center homepage

Hospital buildings completed in 1909
Hospitals established in 1909
Hospitals in Oregon
1909 establishments in Oregon
Catholic health care
Buildings and structures in Roseburg, Oregon